JPI may refer to:
 Pope John Paul I (1912–1978)
 Java Platform Interface
 Jeju Peace Institute, a South Korean think tank
 Jinnah Polytechnic Institute, in Faisalabad, Punjab, Pakistan
 Joint Programming Initiative by the European Commission
 Journal of Political Ideologies
 J.P. Instruments, American avionics manufacturer
 Juvenile Psychopathic Institute, now the Institute for Juvenile Research at the University of Illinois at Chicago